Colinroobie is a rural community in the central part of the Riverina in southern New South Wales, Australia.  Previously referred to as Bents Hill its name was changed in January 2005.

Colinroobie Post Office opened on 5 November 1895 and closed in 1952.

Notes and references

External links

Towns in the Riverina
Towns in New South Wales
Narrandera Shire